KAMAZ is a Russian manufacturer of trucks, buses, and engines headquartered in Naberezhnye Chelny. It is known for its cab over trucks.

Company was founded in 1969. Heavy duty models are exported to many areas of the world including the Commonwealth of Independent States (CIS), Latin America, the Middle East, and Africa. , KAMAZ is the largest truck producer in Russia and the CIS with its factory producing 43,000 trucks a year.

Its trucks have won the Dakar Rally a record eighteen times, the most in the truck category by any manufacturer.

History

In 1969, the Resolution of the Central Committee of the Communist Party of the Soviet Union and the USSR Council of Ministers was approved which envisaged construction of a complex of heavy duty truck production plants. Around 70 potential sites to locate the facilities were investigated. Choice went in favor of Naberezhnye Chelny, then a small town on the Kama River. Naberezhnye Chelny was located in the center of the former Soviet Union. The navigable rivers – the Kama River and the Volga River – as well as proximity of the railway line, were central to meeting the logistical needs of the construction site for materials and equipment. Going forward, the location would also allow for the easy shipping of ready-made trucks to customers. The fact that the huge construction company "KamGESenergostroy" existed in the region allowed construction of plant buildings and apartment blocks for prospective KAMAZ employees to be completed.

Workers and engineers, representing more than 70 ethnicities, converged on Naberezhnye Chelny to fuse into a "melting pot" of the construction project personnel. Orders placed by KAMAZ to procure construction materials and equipment were filled by all the ministries and departments, a total of over 2,000 enterprises. Over 100,000 personnel were employed at the construction site itself. The would-be truck plant was being provided with the most state-of-the-art manufacturing equipment by the contemporary standards. More than 700 international firms were among equipment vendors for KAMAZ facilities, including such globally known corporations as Swindell-Dressler, Holcroft, CE-Cast, Ingersoll Rand, Ex-Cello (U.S.A.), Hueller-Hille, Liebherr (West Germany), Morando, Fiat (Italy), Renault (France), Sandvik (Sweden), Komatsu and Hitachi (Japan).

On December 13, 1969, ground was broken and the first bucket of soil was excavated at the construction site of the Kama River Truck Plant which was rated for production of 150,000 heavy duty trucks and 250,000 engines per year. The Complex of Plants on the Kama River sprawled over a vast territory measuring 57 square km. Concurrent to construction of the truck plant, huge social challenges were tackled. Hundreds of thousands of people were provided by KAMAZ with comfortable housing, modern educational facilities, kindergartens and creches, hospitals and clinics, numerous cultural, sporting, recreational and leisure centers. KAMAZ was instrumental in transforming the Kama River Area into a powerful industrial and scientific research hub and developing the infrastructure for the suburban agricultural zone.

Every year the population of the city grew by another 30-40 thousand or so. Whereas before construction of KAMAZ got underway, 27,000 residents had lived in Naberezhnye Chelny, the current population has now reached more than half a million.

Sanctions 

In March 2022, as a result of the 2022 Russian invasion of Ukraine the EU imposed sanctions on Kamaz.

Sanctioned by New Zealand.

In January 2023 Japan imposed sanctions on Kamaz.

Group structure

Owners and management
The main shareholders of Kamaz are the state corporation Rostec (49.9%), Avtoinvest Limited (23.54%), a Cyprus-registered company, and Daimler Truck (15%). In February 2022, Daimler suspended cooperation with Kamaz due to the Russian invasion of Ukraine. The main beneficiaries of the Cyprus-based company have never been officially disclosed, however it is alleged that the company can be traced to Sergei Roldugin, a concert cellist and personal friend of Vladimir Putin based on the Panama Papers.

At the same time, a 4% stake in the company is publicly traded on the Moscow Exchange, leading the company to have many minority shareholders (more than 76,000 individuals in 2007).

In early March 2008 the Board of Directors of KAMAZ was elected, which included 15 people, including:

The mayor of the city of Naberezhnye Chelny (April 2010 - Prime Minister of Tatarstan) - Ildar Khalikov,
head of the management Federal Agency for State Property Management (Rosimushchestvo) - Ivan V. Aksenov, and
the Director-General of the "Russian Technologies State Corporation" Sergey Chemezov.

Subsidiaries
KAMAZ Publicly Traded Company has more than 110 subsidiaries and affiliates, it owns shares in the authorized capital of more than 50 different companies and businesses. Together they form KAMAZ Group.  The group includes:
 Truck Assembly Plant (Naberezhnye Chelny)
 Metallurgical Complex, KAMAZ PTC
 KAMAZ Foundries (now one of the largest in Russia)
 KAMAZ Forge
 KAMAZ Truck Assembly Plant
 KAMAZ Press and Stamping Plant
 Engine Plant, KAMAZ PTC
 Remdiesel (Engine Re-Manufacture Plant)
 KAMAZ Trade and Finance Company JSC
 Neftekamsk Automotive Plant (NEFAZ) - manufactures buses and vehicles on KAMAZ chassis 
 Auto Trailer Plant OJSC (formerly СЗАП (En:SZAP) of Stavropol)
 KAMAZ Technical Service OJSC
 KAMAZ Auto Technology
 RIZ OJSC (formerly of KAMAZinstrumentspetsmash)
 KIP Master OJSC
 KAMAZ-FINANCE
 KAMAZ-CAPITAL KAMAZ R & D Center

The main production facilities of the plant are located in the industrial area of Naberezhnye Chelny. Nefaz buses are produced in Neftekamsk (Bashkortostan).

KAMAZ owns United Automotive Technologies, a Russian holding of auto parts manufacturers.

The company has overseas manufacturing facilities in the following countries: Vietnam, India, Kazakhstan (KAMAZ-Engineering JSC).

Since 2015 Ganja Auto Plant (Azerbaijan) also assembles Kamaz trucks.

In January 2022, the Hungarian Ministry for Innovation and Technology and Kamaz signed an agreement for production of electrocars in Hungary - about 32000 by 2025 and 320000 by 2030.

Competition
A team, Kamaz Master, which has been active since 1988 has participated as truck category in distinguished rally raid such as Dakar Rally, Silk Way Rally and Africa Eco Race, has brought Kamaz an outstanding fame. Kamaz vehicles have won the truck category of the Dakar Rally 19 times as of 2022.

Engines
 R-6
 Cummins Kama

See also
 List of Kamaz vehicles

References

External links

 
Rostec
Motor vehicle engine manufacturers
Companies based in Tatarstan
Russian brands
Companies listed on the Moscow Exchange
Mercedes-Benz Group
Articles containing video clips
Defence companies of Russia
Diesel engine manufacturers
Engine manufacturers of Russia